Khalil Mardam Bey (1895–1959) was a Syrian poet and critique who is most notable for composing the lyrics of the Syrian National Anthem.

Early life and career

Mardam Bey was born in Ottoman Damascus to a well-known family of Turkish origin.  His father was Ahmed Mukhtar Mardam Bey and his mother was Fatima Mahmoud Hamzaoui; they had six children - of which Mardam Bey was the only son. He was one of the descendants of the Ottoman general, statesman, and Grand Vizier Lala Kara Mustafa Pasha. He was chosen as the leader of the Syrian Literature Association, which was founded in 1926 and annulled by the French.  He studied English literature in London and taught Arabic literature in the National Science College in Syria.  Some of his notable works include Al-Diwan (الديوان) and A’imat al-Adab (أئمة الأدب). He was the chairman of the Arab Scientific Assemblage from 1953 until his death in 1959.

Personal life

Mardam Bey was married and had three daughters and two sons. His oldest son Adnan Mardam Bey was also a poet.

He was cousins with the former Syrian Prime Minister Jamil Mardam Bey.

References 

Muslim poets
Syrian poets
Syrian people of Turkish descent
National anthem writers
People from Damascus
Foreign ministers of Syria
1895 births
1959 deaths
Mardam-Bey family